Doris hayeki is a species of sea slug, a dorid nudibranch, a marine gastropod mollusc in the family Dorididae.

Distribution
This species was described from the intertidal zone at Serra Negra and 2 m depth at Sal-Rei on Sal, Cape Verde.

References

Dorididae
Gastropods described in 1998